David Ollier Weber (born February 28, 1938) is an American novelist and journalist based in Northern California.

Biography
David Weber has written works of fiction including short stories and novels. He has been a Navy officer, a seaman on a Norwegian freighter, and small-craft sailor. His experiences were used in some of his short stories such as "California Standard". Weber later worked as newspaper reporter. He was an editor for the Port of Oakland.

Weber was a free-lance reporter for forty years. He covered Northern California-specific topics of wildfire management. In 2002, Weber founded Kila Springs as both a publishing imprint, and to provide editorial services ranging from reporting and writing to photography and production.

Personal life
Weber was born and spent his early life in Cincinnati.  He moved to Berkeley, California in 1964 after serving four years in naval service. Weber now lives with his wife in Placerville, near Sutter's Mill. Prior to Placerville, Weber was known as “an erudite resident of Comptche”, a town outside of Mendocino, California.  His daughter, Alexa Weber Morales, is a Grammy-award-winning salsa/jazz singer-songwriter and freelance writer. His son Erec-Michael Ollier Weber is the author of the children’s book Bryce and the Blood Ninjas.

Novels
Vanity, Mendocino: Kila Springs Press, 2002 
Baja, Mendocino: Kila Springs Press, 2006 
Catch/Release, Placerville: Kila Springs Press, 2010 
My Life in Sports (five novellas), Placerville: Kila Springs Press, 2012

Short stories
Family Fun (collection), Mendocino: Kila Springs Press, 2006 
Included in Family Fun, “California Standard” was initially published in The Antioch Review (Winter 1977) 
Bad Trips (collection), Placerville: Kila Springs Press, 2012 
Included in Bad Trips, “American Pastime” was initially published in Evergreen Review, November 1970, with illustration by Philip Hays

Non-Fiction
Oakland, Hub of the West, Tulsa: Continental Heritage Press, 1981. Out of print. 
Accustomed to Hope: The Episcopal Church on the Mendocino Coast, Mendocino: Kila Springs Press, 2003

Awards 
Gold Quill Award, 1978
NIHCM 8th Annual Health Care Print Journalism Award, $10,000 prize

References

External links
Official website

1938 births
20th-century American novelists
21st-century American novelists
American male novelists
Living people
Novelists from Ohio
American male short story writers
20th-century American short story writers
21st-century American short story writers
People from Placerville, California
20th-century American male writers
21st-century American male writers
Novelists from California